Paul Seidel (born 30 December 1970) is a Swiss-Italian mathematician. He is a faculty member at the Massachusetts Institute of Technology.

Career
Seidel attended Heidelberg University, where he received his Diplom under supervision of Albrecht Dold in 1994. He then pursued his Ph.D. studies at the University of Oxford under supervision of Simon Donaldson (Thesis: Floer Homology and the Symplectic Isotopy Problem) in 1998. He was a chargé de recherche at the CNRS from 1999 to 2002, a professor at Imperial College London from 2002 to 2003, a professor at the University of Chicago from 2003 to 2007, and then a professor at the Massachusetts Institute of Technology from 2007 onwards.

Awards
In 2000, Seidel was awarded the EMS Prize. In 2010, he was awarded the Oswald Veblen Prize in Geometry "for his fundamental contributions to symplectic geometry and, in particular, for his development of advanced algebraic methods for computation of symplectic invariants." In 2012, he became a fellow of the American Mathematical Society and a Simons Investigator.

Personal life
Seidel is married to Ju-Lee Kim, who is also a professor of mathematics at MIT.

Publications
Fukaya Categories and Picard-Lefschetz Theory, European Mathematical Society, 2008

References

External links
Website at MIT

Laudatio from the Veblen Prize, Notices AMS, April 2010
Honors for the EMS Prize 2000

1970 births
Living people
20th-century German mathematicians
20th-century Swiss mathematicians
21st-century Swiss mathematicians
Heidelberg University alumni
Alumni of the University of Oxford
Massachusetts Institute of Technology School of Science faculty
Fellows of the American Mathematical Society
Radcliffe fellows
Simons Investigator
University of Chicago faculty